The  is located in Tobata-ku, Kitakyushu, Fukuoka Prefecture, Japan. Designed by Arata Isozaki, it sits on a hill straddling the three wards of Kokura Kita, Tobata, and Yahata Higashi. The museum houses more than 6,000 pieces of art, as well as offering various exhibitions throughout the year. The surrounding park not only offers a pleasant view over Tobata but is also a peaceful oasis with artwork in the form of sculptures scattered throughout.

There is a branch of the museum in Riverwalk Kitakyushu.

External links
  Museum website

Art museums and galleries in Japan
Buildings and structures in Kitakyushu
Museums in Fukuoka Prefecture
Arata Isozaki buildings
Tourist attractions in Kitakyushu